Luis Iván Cruz (born May 3, 1968) is a former professional baseball first baseman and past coach for the GCL Braves in 2018

Career
He played during four seasons at the major league level for the New York Yankees, Pittsburgh Pirates, and St. Louis Cardinals. He was drafted by the Detroit Tigers in the 28th round of the 1989 amateur draft. In 2008, he entered his first of two seasons as manager of the U.S. Military All-Stars/Heroes of the Diamond and the Latin Stars "Red, White and Blue Tour" posting consecutive winning seasons. Under Cruz’s tutelage, over 25 players were offered scholarships or professional contracts. In 2010, he made his affiliated debut as the manager of the Peoria Padres, the Rookie Short Season A-ball affiliate of the San Diego Padres. Cruz was named as a coach for the GCL Braves in the Atlanta Braves organization for the 2018 season.

Cruz currently resides in St. Augustine, Florida, with his girlfriend and her daughter.

See also
 List of Major League Baseball players from Puerto Rico

References

1968 births
Living people
Altoona Curve players
Chunichi Dragons players
Columbus Clippers players
Gulf Coast Yankees players
Hanshin Tigers players
Jacksonville Dolphins baseball players
Jacksonville Suns players
Lakeland Tigers players
London Tigers players
Major League Baseball first basemen
Major League Baseball players from Puerto Rico
Memphis Redbirds players
Mexican League baseball first basemen
Mexican League baseball left fielders
Minor league baseball coaches
Minor league baseball managers
Nashville Sounds players
Nippon Professional Baseball first basemen
New York Yankees players
Niagara Falls Rapids players
Pittsburgh Pirates players
People from Fajardo, Puerto Rico
Puerto Rican expatriate baseball players in Canada
Puerto Rican expatriate baseball players in Japan
Puerto Rican expatriate baseball players in Mexico
Saraperos de Saltillo players
St. Louis Cardinals players
Toledo Mud Hens players